Water supply and sanitation in Iraq is characterized by poor water and service quality. Three decades of war, combined with limited environmental awareness, have destroyed Iraq's water resources management system. Thus, Iraq faces difficulties to realize the target of 91% of households using safe drinking water supply by 2015. Currently, 16% of households report daily problems with supply and 20% use an unsafe drinking water source. Furthermore, animal waste and septic tanks pollute the drinking water network.(11)

Water resources

Euphrates and Tigris

Iraq is fed by two major rivers, the Tigris and the Euphrates, both of which originate outside of Iraq. These two rivers account for 98% of Iraq's surface water supply. Their flow is therefore very vulnerable to dams and water diversions in Turkey, Syria, and Iran. The Euphrates does not receive water from permanent tributaries within Iraq territory, and is fed only by seasonal runoff from wadis. The average annual flow of the Euphrates at the border to Turkey is estimated at 30km³, with a factual annual value ranging from 10 to 40km³. The Tigris has an average annual runoff of 21.2km³. Within Iraq, the Tigris River receives water from five main tributaries, namely the Little Khabur, Great Zab, Little Zab, Diyala, and Al Authaim. Yet, only the latter lies entirely within Iraq. All together, 50% of the Tigris water comes from outside the country.

The flow of the rivers varies considerably. Destructive flooding, especially of the Tigris, is not uncommon. In the south of Iraq, large areas are regularly inundated, levees often collapse, and roads and villages must be built on high embankments. Conversely, years of low flow make irrigation difficult. The Euphrates and Tigris they have fallen to less than a third of their normal flow which is largely the result of upstream activities by Turkey and, to a much lesser extent, by Syria and Iran.

In 1946 Turkey agreed to begin monitoring the two rivers and to share related data with Iraq. In 1980 Turkey and Iraq further specified the earlier agreement by establishing a Joint Technical Committee on Regional Waters. Two years later, the Syrian Arab Republic joined the Committee.(9) In the 1980s, Turkey began a $32 billion dam-building project known as the Southeastern Anatolia Project or “GAP” (“Güneydoðu Anadolu Projesi” in Turkish). As part of GAP, Turkey constructed a series of 22 dams and 19 hydroelectric power plants along the Euphrates and Tigris. The key structure is the Atatürk Dam on the Euphrates, which is located approximately 80km upstream from the Syrian border. Turkey has stated that it would only guarantee a flow downstream from the dam of 15.75km³/a (500m³/s) of Euphrates water across the border to the Syrian Arab Republic. This represents about 50% of the natural flow of the Euphrates at the Turkish border. Both Syria and Iraq have tried to inhibit this. They stated that the minimum flow should average at least 700m³/s, but so far Turkey rejected this claim.(10) Syria is in the unusual position of being a downstream country with regard to Turkey and an upstream country with regard to Iraq. In 1990, Syria agreed to share the remaining Euphrates water with Iraq on a 58 percent (Iraq) and 42 percent (Syria) basis, which corresponds to a flow of 9km³/a at the border with Iraq.(9)

In 2008, Turkey, the Syrian Arab Republic, and Iraq decided to cooperate on water issues. They planned to establish a water institute that consists of 18 water experts from each country in order to find a solution for water-related problems among the three countries.(9)

Average Discharge of Water to Iraq (billion m³), after (11)

Rainfall

Rainfall is very seasonal and occurs mainly between December and February. Average rainfall is estimated at 154mm, with a huge range from less than 100mm in the south and up to 1,200mm in the north east. This can lead to extensive flooding in central and southern Iraq.

Groundwater
In many parts of northern Iraq, groundwater is the sole resource and therefore plays a significant role in agriculture, water supply, and health. Even though Iraq currently has complex political and socioeconomic problems, in its northern part fast urbanization and economic expansion are visible everywhere. Monitoring and water management schemes are vital to prevent aquifer over-exploitation in the region. In the plain of northern Iraq, groundwater is tapped by a few thousand wells with a depth ranging from 100 to 200m. In the hills more to the north, spring water from karstic aquifers is used as the main source for drinking water.

Access to drinking water and sanitation 
In the 1970s, Iraq's population enjoyed a relatively high level of water supply and sanitation services. Over 95% of the urban population and over 75% of the rural population had access to safe potable water (12) with a daily per capita provision of about 330 liters per day. Throughout the country there were about 218 water treatment plants and about 1,200 compact water treatment units. In urban communities, 25% of households were connected to sewerage systems, and 50% used on-site septic tanks. Sanitation services covered about 40% of the population in rural areas.(12) However, the country's water infrastructure was severely damaged by the eight-year war against Iran in the 1980s, the Gulf War in 1990-1991, the resulting economic sanctions in the years thereafter, and the United States' military intervention in 2003. As a result, many leakages in the networks call for rehabilitation and the construction of new facilities. Another problem is the proliferation of pumps to boost pressure at the household level, which leads to an overall reduction of pressure.(13)

Access to drinking water, after (14)

Access to improved drinking water sources: 98%, urban and 50%, rural. Access to house connection: 96% urban and 46% rural.(15)

Access to sanitation, after (15) 

Access to improved sanitation: 90% urban and 70% rural, Access to sewerage connection: 37%, urban and 2%, rural.

The Iraqi Marshlands

Environmental history
The Iraqi Marshlands constituted the largest wetland ecosystem in the Middle East, and they are of environmental and cultural significance. They are located in the lower part of the Euphrates-Tigris basin in southern Iraq, and consist of interconnected lakes, mudflats, and wetlands. In the early 1970s, the marshlands extended over 20,000km² of Iraq and Iran. Upstream construction of more than 30 dams diminished water flows, eliminated flood pulses and increased pollution concentrations.(17) 

Yet, while dam construction reduced the amount of water reaching the marches, their destruction is primarily due to intentional drainage during the 1990s for the purpose of drying out the area. These actions led to the systematic shrinkage of the marshlands. By the time the former Iraqi regime collapsed in 2003, over 90% of the area had dried out and turned into salt pans. 

In mid-2003, local residents that had not been displaced opened floodgates and breached embankments to let water back into the marshlands. By April 2004, about 20% of the original marshland area was re-inundated. In order to re-flood and restore the marshes effectively, donor countries like the United States and Italy funded master plans.

Access to drinking water and sanitation 
Only 13% of the remaining residents in the marshlands have piped water supply, while 23% of villages purchase their water from tankers, and 38% of villages obtain desalinated water from reverse osmosis units. More than one third obtain their drinking water directly from the marshes without treatment ( Figure 2 ). This is very alarming because the marsh water is contaminated with pesticides, salts, untreated industrial discharge, and sewage from upstream. Even in villages with piped supply, in 2004 only 13% of these villages could be considered to have access to improved drinking water sources in terms of quality and quantity.(16)

Most settlements lack basic sanitation systems. In 61% of the villages residents used areas near their houses directly for sanitation. As more than one third of the villages uses water directly from the river or marshes without treatment, the current sanitation situation raises serious public health concerns. Outbreaks of water-borne diseases are frequent and the provision of wastewater treatment services is critical. In addition, the return of displaced people to the marshland area places a burden on the provision of drinking water and sanitation.

Water quality

Drinking water
Iraq's drinking water quality is often poor. In 2004, 15,673 drinking water samples in 15 governorates were tested with regard to water quality. 1,010 samples were found to be polluted (6.4%).(14) In the first six months of 2010, 360,000 diarrhea cases were reported, due to polluted drinking water and poor hygiene practices.(11) 8% of the rural population use saline shallow village wells as their main drinking source.

In Basrah, local water sources have a high salt content and water from the network is therefore often only used for washing and cleaning purposes. Drinking water is generally bought from water tankers or markets that receive supplies from water treatment plants that use reverse osmosis to remove excess salt.(20)

Groundwater
Concerning groundwater quality, the prevalence of carbonate sedimentary rocks in the mountains in the north leads to pH values between 6.5 and 8.0, and a generally low mineral content. The Bakhtiari aquifer, which lies in the northwestern mountain foothills, has a thickness of up to 6000m (18), and its water is generally of good quality. The exceptions are waters from shallow wells that are located near cities or villages. These waters are often contaminated, mainly due to free seepage of sewage water. Quality of waters that drained through complex aquifer systems or Fars formations depend on local factors, mainly the presence of evaporation gypsum or anhydrite layers. Where they are present, the total salinity and content of Na, Cl, NO3, SO4, and Fe ions increase. Such Fars formations cover a large area of Iraq. In southern Iraq, good quality groundwater is limited because of high levels of salinity.(18) Salinity levels in Basrah are well above 7000ppm; the WHO standard for human consumption is 500ppm or less.

Responsibility for water supply and sanitation 
The Ministry of Water Resources (MWR) is responsible for Iraq's water usage. They are operating 25 major dams, hydro power stations, and barrages as well as 275 irrigation pumping stations. Five commissions and eleven companies, containing 12,000 staff, belong to the Ministry of Water Resources. Other important institutions related to water issues are the Ministry of Agriculture, the Ministry of Energy, the Ministry of Municipalities and Public Works, the Ministry of Environment as well as some other ministries and local governorates which also play a role in connections to economic concerns and human resources.(11)

Iraq's constitution of 2005, requires that the regional and federal governments ensure the so-called “just distribution” of water in Iraq. Since Iraq is considered as an extremely water stressed country, it will be a big effort to achieve this mandate. According to the report from UNICEF, between 2005 and 2008, over 600 workers from the Ministry of Municipalities and Public works were killed while attempting to repair water networks. Their deaths critically damaged the sector, and cut off entire communities from essential services.

Furthermore, one of the principal challenges in water management is the coordination of ministerial and regional interests within Iraq. One main issue is the awareness of the degradation of Iraq's natural resources and ecosystems and a concrete treatment plan to protect the environment. The UN is supporting the Government of Iraq with 121 water projects.(11)

Financial aspects
Since the water tariff in Iraq is very low, revenues are insufficient to recover the cost of water supply and sanitation. Metering is not common and water bills are thus independent of consumption. People that have to obtain their water from tankers or desalination plants allegedly spend one-third of their income on purchasing potable water. Where enough safe drinking water is available, people are not aware of its value, and consume 350 liters per capita per day.

References

Sources
 Aquastat. Irrigation in the Middle East region in figures. [Online] 2008. [Cited: 02 15, 2011.] http://www.fao.org/nr/water/aquastat/countries/iraq/index.stm.
 Iraqi Ministries of Environment Water Resources, Municipalities and Public Works. New Eden Master Plan for integrated water resources management in the Marshlands Area. 2006. Vol. 1 Overview of present conditions and current use of the water in the marshlands area.
 IAU - Inter-Agency Information and Analysis Unit. Water in Iraq Factsheet. October 2010.
 Mayoralty of Baghdad. Republic of Iraq - Emergency Baghdad Water Supply and Sanitation Project - Project Information Document. 2004.
 General directorate for water - Ministry of Municipalities. Water Demand and Supply in Iraq - Vision, Approach and Efforts .
 WHO/UNICEF. Joint Monitoring Programme for Water Supply and Sanitation, Estimates for the use of "Improved Drinking-Water Sources". updated 2010.
 —. Joint Monitoring Programme for Water Supply and Sanitation, Estimates for the use of "Improved Sanitation Facilities". updated 2010.
 United Nations Environment Programme. Support for Environmental Management of The Iraqi Marshlands. 2009.
 Iraqi Ministries of Environment, Water Resources, Municipalities and Public Works. New Eden Master Plan for Integrated Water Resources Management in the Marshlands Area. 2006.
 Aquastat. Irrigation in the Middle East region in figures. [Online] 2008. [Cited: 15 02 2011.] http://www.fao.org/nr/water/aquastat/countries/iraq/index.stm.
 IAU - Inter-Agency Information and Analysis Unit. [Online] March 2009. [Cited: February 22, 2011.]
 —. Basrah Governorate Profile. February 2011.
 United States Agency for International Development. The United States and the Iraqi Marshlands: An Environmental Response. 2004.
 Sultan, Dr. Maitham A. World Water Assessment Programme. [Online] [Cited: 15 02 2011.] http://www.unesco.org/water/wwap/news/iraq.shtml.

 
Environment of Iraq
Health in Iraq